Edward Lyulph Stanley, 4th Baron Sheffield, 4th Baron Stanley of Alderley and 3rd Baron Eddisbury PC (16 May 1839 – 18 March 1925) was an English peer.

Life
He was the son of Edward Stanley, 2nd Baron Stanley of Alderley, and the former Henrietta Dillon-Lee. He attended Eton College between 1851 and 1857, gaining the Tomline Prize for mathematics in 1857. He read Greats at Balliol College, Oxford, gaining a first-class degree and fellowship to the college in 1861.  He was called to the bar in 1865.

Stanley (then known as the Honourable Edward Lyulph Stanley) contested Oldham, in the Liberal interest, at elections in 1872, 1874, 1880 and 1885. He only won the 1880 contest and served in the House of Commons during the 1880–1885 Parliament. He was appointed a Privy Counsellor in 1910.

Stanley was a member of the London School Board from 1876 to 1885 and also from 1888 to 1896. He wrote a book Our National Education (1899).

Family
Stanley married Mary Katherine Bell, daughter of Lowthian Bell, on 6 February 1873. They had eight children:

Katharine Florence Clementine Stanley (died 1884)
Henrietta Margaret Stanley (1874–1956), married William Edmund Goodenough.
Arthur Stanley, 5th Baron Stanley of Alderley (1875–1931)
Edward John Stanley (1878–1908)
Lt.-Col. Oliver Hugh Stanley (1879–1952)
Sylvia Laura Stanley (1882–1980), married Anthony Morton Henley, and was mother of Rosalind Pitt-Rivers.
Blanche Florence Daphne Stanley (1885–1968), married Eric Pearce-Serocold.
Beatrice Venetia Stanley (1887–1948)

References

 Who's Who of British members of parliament: Volume I 1832-1885, edited by M. Stenton (The Harvester Press 1976)

External links
 

1839 births
1925 deaths
People educated at Eton College
Alumni of Balliol College, Oxford
Barons Sheffield
Barons Stanley of Alderley
Younger sons of barons
Deputy Lieutenants of Anglesey
Stanley, Edward Lyulph
Stanley, Edward Lyulph
UK MPs who inherited peerages
Stanley, Edward Lyulph
Politics of the Metropolitan Borough of Oldham
Edward
Members of the London School Board